Minnesota State Highway 172 (MN 172) is a  highway in far northern Minnesota, which runs from its intersection with State Highway 11 at Baudette and continues north to its northern terminus in Wheeler's Point at the Lake of the Woods.

The route passes through the community of Hackett.

Highway 172 generally follows the Rainy River from Baudette to the Lake of the Woods.

Route description
State Highway 172 serves as a north–south route between Baudette, Hackett, Wheeler's Point, and the Lake of the Woods.

Zippel Bay State Park is located 6 miles west of the Wheeler's Point junction of Highway 172 and County Road 8.  The park entrance is located on County Road 8.

The route is legally defined as Route 140 in the Minnesota Statutes. It is not marked with this number.

History
Highway 172 was authorized in 1933 and was originally numbered 72 as the north end of State Highway 72 between 1934 and 1963.

In 1963, the short connection to the Canadian border crossing at Baudette (now designated as part of Highway 72) was added to the highway system.  The former northern section of Highway 72 between State Highway 11 (at Baudette) and Wheeler's Point (at Lake of the Woods) was then renumbered 172 at this time.

172 was paved (as 72) by 1940 between Highway 11 at Baudette and County Road 6.  The section of 172 (as 72) between County Road 6 and Wheeler's Point was paved by 1953.

Highway 172 was numbered as an extension of Highway 72.

Major intersections

References

172
Transportation in Lake of the Woods County, Minnesota